The Global Sustainability Assessment System (GSAS) [Originally QSAS] is the first performance-based system in the Middle East and North Africa (MENA) region, developed for assessing and rating buildings and infrastructure for their sustainability impacts. In 2016, FIFA officially endorsed GSAS as the sustainability assessment system for Qatar's eight stadiums set to host the 2022 FIFA World Cup. The primary objective of GSAS is to create a sustainable built environment that minimizes ecological impact and reduces resources consumption while addressing the local needs and environmental conditions specific to the region. GSAS adopts an integrated lifecycle approach for the assessment of the built environment including design, construction and operation phases.

Developed in 2007 by the Gulf Organisation for Research and Development (GORD) in collaboration with the TC Chan Center at the University of Pennsylvania, the School of Architecture at the Georgia Tech Research Institute, and other reputed houses of expertise, GSAS announced its fourth edition in 2019. GSAS manuals are revised on a regular basis to reflect all technical changes and provide relevant information to stay conversant based on best practices, GSAS Trust experience and GSAS users feedback. With GSAS at its core, GORD has built a comprehensive continuum of sustainability that encompasses everything from assessing and rating built-environments to educating and certifying professionals.

GSAS framework is comprehensive and designed to follow an integrated life cycle approach to improve the sustainability performance of the built environment. GSAS addresses the sustainability impacts during the design, construction and operation stages of buildings and infrastructure projects. The framework addresses eight categories of macro and micro level aspects for a multidimensional focus on sustainability. These categories are Urban Connectivity; Site; Energy; Water; Materials; Indoor/Outdoor Environment; Cultural & Economic Value; and Management & Operations. Each GSAS Category is associated with a direct impact on environmental sustainability and/or human well-being and provides indicators to measure different associated aspects. These categories are then sub-divided into specific criteria that measure and define the individual issues. Categories, criteria, and measurements are defined to be performance based and quantifiable, as far as possible.

GSAS identifies several sustainability challenges in the built environment. The challenges include air pollution, land use contamination, fossil fuel depletion, water depletion, water pollution, materials depletion, human discomfort and sickness and climate change. These challenges were used to guide the identified framework to ensure robustness in mitigating the adverse environmental impacts of the built environment.

GSAS Framework Development 
The groundwork of GSAS began with a comprehensive review of best practices from established international and regional sustainability rating systems. 2007 marked the start of the development of GSAS Framework. It then went through four stages of the development process up until 2009. The development process conducted a rigorous technical analysis by deploying a rule-based process of analysis and feedback based on technology developments and market feedback.

Stage (I) of the development process involved the examination of more than 140 building rating systems, tools, guidelines and standards around the globe. The applicability of the sustainability rating systems, tools, and guidelines to the context of the region were evaluated in terms of four parameters: Ecology & Climate, Materials & Resources, Policies & Laws and Culture & Heritage.

Stage (II) of the development process focused on narrowing down the choice to 40 whole building rating systems which were further analyzed based on their scope, applicability, adaptability, transparency and relevance. The main outcome of this stage indicated that several systems were not original and could be considered customized versions of well-established systems. Hence, this resulted in narrowing down the list to 6 well-established rating systems and 2 Energy standards. The six rating systems were BREEAM from the UK, CASBEE from Japan, CEPAS from Hong Kong, Green Globes from Canada, LEED from the USA, and the International SBTool, where the Energy standards were CEN-ISO developed in Europe and ASHRAE from the USA.

Stage (III) of the development process began with a thorough review analysis of the selected frameworks. Criteria were established to rate the credibility and effectiveness of the 6 chosen systems methods and structures. Using the Pacific Northwest Laboratory’s Sustainable Building Rating Systems Summary as a guideline, each of the 6 systems were reviewed using the criteria of Development, Usability, System Maturity, Technical Content, Measurability & Verification, and Communicability.

Stage (IV) of the development process evaluated the achievements and limitations of the rating systems. The result of the evaluations yielded the unique GSAS framework, evaluation methodologies, weightings and scoring, translated in GSAS categories and criteria.

Categories and Weights 
GSAS framework addresses eight categories of macro and micro level aspects for a multidimensional focus on sustainability. These categories include Urban Connectivity, Site, Energy, Water, Materials, Indoor/Outdoor Environment, Cultural & Economic Value and Management & Operations.

Each GSAS Category is associated with a direct impact on environmental sustainability and/or human well-being and provides indicators to measure different associated aspects. These categories are then sub-divided into specific criteria that measure and define the individual issues. Categories, criteria, and measurements are defined to be performance based and quantifiable, as far as possible. Best practices pertaining to the implementation of measures under each criterion are provided as guidelines in GSAS Guidelines manuals.

Each criterion in GSAS is provided with explanations of the measurement principle and method that can be found in the guidelines and assessment manuals. For each of GSAS assessment manuals, each criterion is provided with explanations of the submittal requirements. The text on each criterion specifies a process for measuring the individual aspect that has an environmental impact and supporting it with the required documentation. A level is then awarded to each criterion based on the achievement as per the pre-defined rating mechanism. Incentive weights are allocated for certain GSAS criteria in different GSAS certification schemes to encourage additional effort to implement best practice in sustainability.

Application and Rating Mechanism 
To be GSAS certified, a project is required to submit the documents (including drawings, schematics, sketches, design reports, simulation reports and vendor’s data) required for each criterion to demonstrate compliance.

GSAS scoring sheets are useful sensitivity analysis tools to enable projects to compute the anticipated criteria levels, project score and corresponding certification rating under multiple scenarios. The tool provides the user with the opportunity to target, adjust and amend the level of each individual criterion to predict the final rating. GSAS scoring sheets are used for all certification types and their different schemes. The scoring sheet lists all categories, the criteria under each category, their weight and target level. Criteria levels are input in GSAS scoring sheet, allowing the user to conduct a sensitivity analysis to predict the overall rating of the project.

GSAS Rating indicates the overall achievement of the project and is determined by summing up the individual scores of all criteria. Each certification type has a unique rating nomenclature. The rating is allocated based on the level of project compliance against different categories with varying weights. The eight categories are weighted based on their impact toward sustainability: Energy (24%),Water (16%), Indoor Environment (19%), Site (17%), Urban Connectivity (6%), Materials (9%), Management & Operations (5%), and Cultural & Economic Value (4%).

Furthermore, GSAS Level indicates the degree of compliance with the requirements of the criterion and ranges from lowest -1 to highest 3. The level is confirmed for a criterion by GSAS Trust after verification. Each criterion has a score of numeric value which is calculated by multiplying the percentage weight by the criterion level. The score is automatically calculated by GSAS scoring sheet provided by GSAS Trust. It is used to calculate the overall score for the project. The criterion level is generated by GSAS calculators.

References

Building energy rating
Sustainable building rating systems